Lori may refer to:
Lori (given name)
Lori Province, Armenia
Lori Fortress, a fortress in Armenia
Lori Berd, a village in Armenia
Kingdom of Tashir-Dzoraget, a historical Armenian kingdom from c. 980 to 1240, sometimes known as the Kingdom of Lori
Lori (ethnic group), a nomadic community found in Balochistan region of Pakistan and Iran
Luri language (or Lori language), spoken by the Lur people Lorestān, Iran
Hesperornithoides, a dinosaur whose type specimen was nicknamed "Lori" until it was described in 2019
William Lori (born 1951), U.S. Catholic bishop
Lori, Grand'Anse, a village in the Jérémie commune of Haiti
Lori Vanadzor, defunct football club from Vanadzor
Lori FC, football club from Vanadzor founded in 2017
Aircraft name of National Airlines Flight 102

See also
Lory (disambiguation)
Lorry (disambiguation)
Loris (disambiguation)
Loris, any of several small strepsirrhine primates, of the family Lorisidae, found in India and southeast Asia